Tushy may refer to:

 A slang word for buttocks, derived from the Yiddish tuchas
 Tushy.com, a pornographic film brand owned by Vixen (adult film company)
 Tushy, an American brand of add-on bidets and other toilet-related  equipment

See also
Tushi, a village in Iran
Tush (disambiguation)